Marrakesh Records is a small UK indie label which, in a previous guise as Lizard King, first signed the Killers. It was founded by Dominic Hardisty and is located in London, England.

Artists
The Killers
Operahouse
Low vs Diamond
Kissy Sell Out
Rob Sharples

See also 
 List of record labels

References

British independent record labels
Indie rock record labels
The Killers